was a Japanese samurai of the late Edo period. The 15th head of the Watari-Date family, Kuninari served as a retainer of Sendai han. Following the defeat of the Sendai domain during the Boshin War, he assisted in helping the daimyō of Sendai, Date Munemoto, in declaring allegiance to the new government. Kuninari requested permission from the Meiji Government to settle in Hokkaido and assist in land reclamation; this was granted in January 1870 (Meiji 3).

See also
 Date clan

Notes

References 
Howell, David L. (1983). "Early 'shizoku' colonization of Hokkaidō". Journal of Asian History. 17: 40–67 – via JSTOR. www.jstor.org/stable/41930505.

External links
Official site of Date City, Hokkaido

1841 births
1904 deaths
Meiji Restoration
Samurai
Date clan
People from Miyagi Prefecture
People from Date, Hokkaido